JWH-367 ([5-(3-methoxyphenyl)-1-pentylpyrrol-3-yl]-naphthalen-1-ylmethanone) is a synthetic cannabinoid from the naphthoylpyrrole family which acts as an agonist of the CB1 (Ki = 53 ± 2nM) and CB2 (Ki = 23 ± 1nM) receptors, binding ~2.3 times stronger to the CB2 receptor than to the CB1 receptor. JWH-367 was first synthesized in 2006 by John W. Huffman and colleagues to examine the nature of ligand binding to the CB1 receptor.

Legality
In the United States JWH-367 is not federally scheduled, although some states have passed legislation banning the sale, possession, and manufacture of JWH-367.

In Canada, JWH-367 and other naphthoylpyrrole-based cannabinoids are Schedule II controlled substances under the Controlled Drugs and Substances Act.

In the United Kingdom, JWH-367 and other naphthoylpyrrole-based cannabinoids are considered Class B drugs under the Misuse of Drugs Act 1971.

See also
List of JWH cannabinoids
Synthetic cannabinoid

References 

JWH cannabinoids
CB1 receptor agonists
CB2 receptor agonists
Designer drugs
Naphthoylpyrroles